The 670th Radar Squadron is an inactive United States Air Force unit. It was last assigned to the 26th Air Division, Aerospace Defense Command, operating San Pedro Hill Air Force Station radars while posted at Fort MacArthur, California. It was inactivated on 1 April 1976.

The unit was a General Surveillance Radar squadron providing for the air defense of the United States.

Lineage
Assignments
 542d Aircraft Control and Warning Group, 5 May 1950
 544th Aircraft Control and Warning Group, 27 November 1950
 27th Air Division, 6 February 1952
 Los Angeles Air Defense Sector, 1 October 1959
 27th Air Division, 1 April 1966
 26th Air Division, 19 November 1969 – 1 April 1976

Stations
 Camp Cooke, California, 5 May 1950
 San Clemente Island AFS, California, 1 February 1952
 Fort MacArthur, California, April 1961-1 April 1976

References

 Mueller, Robert, Air Force Bases, Vol. I, Active Air Force Bases Within the United States of America on 17 September 1982,  Office of Air Force History, Washington DC (1989) .
 Winkler, David F. & Webster, Julie L., Searching the Skies, The Legacy of the United States Cold War Defense Radar Program,  US Army Construction Engineering Research Laboratories, Champaign, IL (1997).

Aerospace Defense Command units
1961 in military history
1976 in military history
Military units and formations of the United States in the Cold War
Radar squadrons of the United States Air Force